Chenereilles is a commune in the Haute-Loire department in south-central France.

Geography
The river Lignon du Velay flows through the commune.

Population

References

See also
 Communes of the Haute-Loire department

Communes of Haute-Loire